The 2018 LFA Super Taça was the 3rd staging of the LFA Super Taça. A cup played in a single game between the two best teams in the country.

The Match

The match of this edition of LFA Super Taça was played on November 25, 2018 at the National Stadium (East Timor) in the city of Díli, in East Timor.
The National Stadium has a maximum capacity of 5,000 spectators.

Participants are classified through two main competitions: Liga Futebol Amadora Primeira Divisão and Taça 12 de Novembro.

The cup was disputed by two teams: one classified through the 2018 Liga Futebol Amadora Primeira Divisão and the other through the 2018 Taça 12 de Novembro.

The Boavista FC team was champion of the 2018 Liga Futebol Amadora Primeira Divisão and Atlético Ultramar team was champion of the 2018 Taça 12 de Novembro. Thus, the two teams won the right to compete in the SuperTaça.

Final

References

Taça 12 de Novembro
Liga Futebol Amadora
Timor-Leste